The Spokane–Spokane Valley Metropolitan Statistical Area, as defined by the United States Census Bureau, is an area consisting of Spokane and Stevens counties in Washington state, anchored by the city of Spokane and its largest suburb, Spokane Valley. As of July 1, 2021, the MSA had an estimated population of 593,466. The Spokane Metropolitan Area and the neighboring
Coeur d'Alene metropolitan area, make up the larger Spokane–Coeur d'Alene combined statistical area. The urban areas of the two MSAs largely follow the path of Interstate 90 between Spokane and Coeur d'Alene. In 2010, the Spokane–Spokane Valley MSA had a gross metropolitan product of $20.413 billion.

Counties
Spokane
Stevens

Communities

Over 200,000 inhabitants

Spokane - (principal city)

50,000 to 199,999 inhabitants
Spokane Valley - (principal city)

10,000 to 49,999 inhabitants
 Airway Heights
 Cheney
 Fairwood
 Liberty Lake

5,000 to 9,999 inhabitants
 Country Homes
 Fairchild AFB
 Mead
 Medical Lake
 Otis Orchards-East Farms
 Town and Country

1,000 to 4,999 inhabitants
 Chewelah
 Colville 
 Deer Park
 Kettle Falls
 Millwood

1,000 inhabitants or fewer
 Addy
 Clayton
 Fairfield
 Four Lakes
 Green Bluff
 Latah
 Loon Lake
 Marcus
 Northport
 Rockford
 Spangle
 Springdale
 Waverly
 Valley

Unincorporated places

Amber
Arden
Bluecreek
Cedonia
Chattaroy
Colbert
Echo
Elk
Espanola
Evans
Ford
Four Lakes
Freedom
Fruitland
Gifford
Green Bluff
Greenacres
Hunters
Lakeside
Marshall
Mead
Mica
Milan
Newman Lake
Nine Mile Falls
Onion Creek
Plaza
Rice
Ruby
Spokane Bridge
Suncrest (part of Nine Mile Falls)
Tumtum (also known as Tum Tum)
Tyler
Valleyford
Wellpinit

Demographics
As of 2020, there were 585,784 people and 224,385 households residing within the MSA. The racial makeup of the MSA was 86% White, 2% Black, 1% Native, 2% Asian, 0% Islander, and 5% Hispanic. According to the Association of Religion Data Archives' 2010 Metro Area Membership Report, the denominational affiliations of the Spokane MSA are 64,277 Evangelical Protestant, 682 Black Protestant, 24,826 Mainline Protestant, 754 Orthodox, 66,202 Catholic, 31,674 Other, and 339,338 Unclaimed.

See also
Washington census statistical areas

References

Spokane, Washington
Regions of Washington (state)
Metropolitan areas of Washington (state)